Moon people may refer to
 Yuezhi, an ancient people of East Asia
 Supposed inhabitants of the Moon, see Moon in fiction#Inhabited Moon

See also
 Moon Man (disambiguation)
 Moonie (disambiguation)
 Moonies